The following highways are numbered 601:

Canada
  Alberta Highway 601
  Ontario Highway 601
  Saskatchewan Highway 601

Costa Rica
  National Route 601

United Kingdom
 A601(M) motorway - Lancashire

United States